The Seetal Alps are a mountain range in the Lavanttal or Noric Alps in Austria south of the River Mur between Scheifling and Zeltweg.
Their highest peak is the Zirbitzkogel (2,396 m).

Topography 
The Seetal Alps are bounded to the north by the Mur valley, to the east by the Obdach Saddle, to the south by the Klippitztörl and to the west by the Neumarkt Saddle. The majority of the range lies within the Austrian state of Styria, only from the Klippitztörl does it extend into Carinthia. The most important summits, from north to south, are:

Weißeck (1,743 m)
Brandriegel (1,721 m)
Hohe Ranach (1,981 m)
Erslstand (2,124 m)
Wenzelalpe (2,151 m)
Kreiskogel (2,306 m) with the very difficult Lukas-Max klettersteig  
Scharfes Eck (2,364 m)
Zirbitzkogel (2,396 m)
Fuchskogel (2,214 m)
Streitwiesenalm (called the Blutwiese locally) and the Judenburg Cross (1,764 m)
Zöhrerkogel (1,874 m)
Angerlkogel (1,774 m)
Jägerstube (1,749 m)

On the Klippitztörl is a large ski area. There is also skiing near the Sabathy Hut and Tonner Hut.

The high mountain chain has several rugged rock formations that rise above the tree line.

The region is crossed by the Eisenwurzenweg (Austrian long-distance path 08). This reaches its highest point at the Zirbitzkogel.

Tourism 
The range is popular with climbers and walkers. In addition it has several ski areas on and to the north of the Klippitztörl.

Huts 

Winterleiten Hut (1,782 m) northeast of the Zirbitzkogel
Alpengasthof Sabathy (1,620 m), at the eastern foot of the Zirbitzkogel
Zirbitzkogel House (2,376 m), on the summit of the Zirbitzkogel
Tonner Hut (1,600 m), halfway up the Zirbitzkogel from Mühlen and Zirbitzkogel
Waldheim Hut (1,614 m), halfway up the Zirbitzkogel from Obdach
St.Martin's Hut (1,710 m), near the Streitwiesenalm 
Klippitztörl Hut (1,644 m), on the Klippitztörl near the ski area

References

External links 

 Seetal Alps at hribi.net

 
Mountain ranges of Europe
Mountain ranges of the Alps
Mountain ranges of Styria